is a Japanese actor and tarento represented by Horipro Improvement Academy.

Filmography

TV series

Dramas

Advertisements

Films

Other

References

External links
 

Japanese male child actors
Japanese entertainers
1998 births
Living people
Male actors from Tokyo